The Hatfields and the McCoys is a 1975 American Western television film about the feud between the Hatfields and McCoys starring Jack Palance, Steve Forrest, Richard Hatch, James Keach and Robert Carradine. The film originally aired as the ABC Movie of the Week on January 15, 1975.

During filming Carradine expressed interest that he and his brothers could play the Younger brothers in a proposed film Keach wanted to make where he and his brother Stacy played the James brothers. This led to the Keaches and the Carradines appearing in The Long Riders (1980).

Cast
Jack Palance as Devil Anse Hatfield
Steve Forrest as Randall McCoy
Richard Hatch as Johnse Hatfield
Karen Lamm as Rose Ann McCoy
James Keach as Jim McCoy
John Calvin as Cotton Top
Robert Carradine as Bob Hatfield
Gerrit Graham as Calvin McCoy
Morgan Woodward as Ellison Hatfield

References

External links
The Hatfields and McCoys at IMDb

1975 television films
ABC Movie of the Week
1975 Western (genre) films
Films about feuds
Films scored by Ken Lauber
Films set in the 1800s
Films directed by Clyde Ware
American Western (genre) television films
1970s English-language films